Fritz Gareis (1872 – 1925) was an Austro-Hungarian artist and cartoonist for the leftwing Vienna satirical magazine Götz von Berlichingen. He drew a comic titled 'Bilderbogen des kleinen Lebens.' His father of the same name (1845–1903) was also an artist.

WWI

During the First World War Fritz Gareis contributed to the Imperial Austro-Hungarian war effort by creating donation stamps, propaganda postcards and posters.

Bilderbogen des kleinen Lebens

Gareis wrote Bilderbogen des kleinen Lebens or “Scenes from ordinary life” about the fictional Riebeisel family. Paul M. Malone an associate professor at the University of Waterloo claims that it was the first comic strip with speech balloons in Germany and might be the first regularly appearing comic with speech balloons in continental Europe. Gareis started the comic on 2 November 1923 and it became so popular that after his death on 5 October 1925, and two-month hiatus, the strip continued with Karl Theodor Zelger drawing it until 1934.

See also

List of Austrian artists and architects
Aftermath of World War I
1910s in comics

Bibliography 
Notes

References 

Austrian cartoonists
1872 births
1925 deaths
1910s comics
1920s comics